Arab Unity School is located in Dubai, United Arab Emirates. The school educates about 3000 in Kindergarten to Grade 13, to the IGCSE curriculum and for A levels. The school's director and founder was Zainab Taher until she died in Mumbai on Monday, 2 May 2022. Arab Unity was founded in 1974.

Academic standards
In 2002, this became the first school to in the Middle East to obtain the 'Fellowship Centre' status from Cambridge International Examinations.

The school pioneered the introduction of ICT skills tests into the school curriculum.

KHDA inspection report
The Knowledge and Human Development Authority (KHDA), an educational quality assurance authority in Dubai, has published the following the inspection ratings for Arab Unity School.

The 2009 rating of "Unsatisfactory" was an all-time low for the school. The main reason given for the rating was poor management and a very poor standard of teaching and a dirty environment. In 2010, 2011, 2012, and 2013 the school received the rating of "Acceptable".

Sport
Arab Unity specializes in cricket, basketball, and football. In 2006, the school won the under-18 Pepsi inter-school cricket championship. Student Adil Khalil won the cricket 'Best All-rounder' award at under-15 inter-school level for 2008–09. Arab Unity School also won the inter-school cricket championship in 2015.

Notes

References
 https://web.archive.org/web/20090408024404/http://archive.gulfnews.com/nation/Education/10300574.html
 http://www.gulfnews.com/nation/Education/10300570.html

External links

 Official site

Schools in Dubai
International schools in the United Arab Emirates
Cambridge schools in the United Arab Emirates